The Charles F. Berg Building, also the Dolph Building is an art-deco building in downtown Portland, Oregon. It is one of the few examples of commercial use of art-deco in Portland.

The structure was built in 1902, and remodeled into a women's clothing store with its signature facade in 1930. Charles F. Berg (1871–1932), the building's namesake, was the owner of the store once located inside. At the time, Charles F. Berg was an upscale store, and featured ornate and lavish interior fixtures such as a Tiffany-designed elevator. The facade includes inlays of 14 Karat gold.

Currently, the building is used as offices, with a retail arcade on the ground floor. The Berg building was added to the National Register of Historic Places in 1983.

See also
Architecture of Portland, Oregon
National Register of Historic Places listings in Southwest Portland, Oregon

References

External links
 

Commercial buildings completed in 1902
Commercial buildings completed in 1930
Art Deco architecture in Oregon
National Register of Historic Places in Portland, Oregon
Commercial buildings on the National Register of Historic Places in Oregon
1902 establishments in Oregon
Southwest Portland, Oregon
Portland Historic Landmarks